Gare is a quarter in central Luxembourg City, in southern Luxembourg. The quarter has, since 1859, been the location of Luxembourg's principal railway station and terminus, Luxembourg station, around which it subsequently developed. The quarter's name translates into English, from the French Gare, to "station".

Geographically, the quarter is situated on the Bourbon plateau, and is separated from the Ville Haute quarter, heart of Luxembourg's ancient fortifications, by a steep valley where the Pétrusse joins the Alzette river in the Grund quarter. The valley was first spanned by the Passerelle viaduct, opened in 1859.

Following the 1867 Treaty of London, which ordered the dismantling of Luxembourg's fortifications, the quarter expanded rapidly, notably with the construction of the Adolphe Bridge, opened in 1903, and connected to the station by the grand Avenue de la Liberté.

, the quarter has a population of 11,040 inhabitants.

Gallery

References

External links

Quarters of Luxembourg City